Arus Gyulbudaghyan (born January 15, 1979, in Yerevan, Armenian SSR) is a female Armenian retired diver. She competed at the 1996 Summer Olympics in the women's 3 metre springboard.

References

External links
Sports-Reference.com

1979 births
Living people
Sportspeople from Yerevan
Armenian female divers
Olympic divers of Armenia
Divers at the 1996 Summer Olympics
20th-century Armenian women